Filago discolor is a species of flowering plant in the family Asteraceae. It is native to Sicily, Malta, Algeria, and Morocco.

References

Gnaphalieae